Wallacedene is an informal housing settlement on the eastern outskirts of Cape Town, South Africa. The settlement was established during the 1980s when the relaxation of pass laws allowed rural populations to more readily migrate to urban centres. By 2004, Wallacedene had an estimated population of 21,000 people. The housing rights activist Irene Grootboom lived in Wallacedene. Grootboom and other inhabitants won a Constitutional Court ruling in 2000 which stated that they could not be evicted without being offered alternative accommodation.

References

Shanty towns in South Africa
Slums in South Africa
Suburbs of Cape Town
Housing in South Africa